Luciano Pacomio (born November 4, 1941, in Villanova Monferrato) is the emeritus bishop of the Roman Catholic Diocese of Mondovì.

Biography 

He was ordained a priest on June 29, 1965.

He was appointed bishop of Mondovì on December 3, 1996.

He was appointed bishop of Mondovì on December 3, 1996, and received his episcopal consecration on January 6, 1997, following from pope John Paul II. He replaced the previous bishop of Mondovì Enrico Masseroni and took retirement on September 29, 2017.

References

Resources
 Profile of Mons. Pcomio 
 Site of Diocese of Mondovì

1941 births
Living people
People from the Province of Alessandria
Bishops of Mondovì
20th-century Italian Roman Catholic priests